Squire Edward Howard (May 15, 1840 – November 26, 1912) was a Medal of Honor recipient who served for the United States Army during the American Civil War.

Civil War
Howard enlisted into the Union Army at Townshend, Vermont, as a sergeant. He was commissioned as a second lieutenant in January 1863, and was discharged as a captain in December 1864. Howard was issued the Medal of Honor in January 1894 for his actions on January 14, 1863, during the Bayou Teche Campaign.

Medal of Honor citation
"Voluntarily carried an important message through the heavy fire of the enemy to bring aid and save the gunboat Calhoun."

See also

List of Medal of Honor recipients

References

Union Army officers
1840 births
1912 deaths
United States Army Medal of Honor recipients
People from Jamaica, Vermont
American Civil War recipients of the Medal of Honor